Nagaram may refer to:

 Nagaram, East Godavari district, Andhra Pradesh, India
 Nagaram, Guntur district, Andhra Pradesh, India
 Nagaram, Medchal–Malkajgiri district, Telangana, India
 Nagaram (2007 film), an Indian Malayalam film
 Nagaram (2008 film), an Indian Telugu action film
 Nagaram (2010 film) or Nagaram Marupakkam, an Indian Tamil action film

See also
 Vijaynagar (disambiguation), including uses of Vizianagaram